Skeleton Repelent is the fourth solo album by American indie hip hop artist Doseone. It was released in 2007. The album features contributions from Dan Boeckner of Wolf Parade.

Track listing
 You Circa You - 3:27
 Win It Off II - 2:29
 Tar Of Day - 5:33
 Death Death Death Death Death - 2:14
 The Line In The Cold (featuring Dan Boeckner) - 3:33
 Hardest Laugh - 2:39
 The Great Compromise - 7:53
 Mom - 3:36
 Hell Of January - 2:37
 Overchoiced (featuring Dan Boeckner) - 3:18

References

2007 albums
Doseone albums